Loch Bà is the name of several lochs in Scotland:
Loch Bà, Mull, on the Isle of Mull, in Argyll and Bute council area
Loch Bà, Rannoch Moor, in Highland council area